Teemore Shamrocks is a Gaelic football club based in the village of Teemore, County Fermanagh, Northern Ireland. They are the most successful club in the Fermanagh Senior Football Championship having won it 21 times.

History
The club was founded in 1904 and won the inaugural Fermanagh Senior Championship that year. They have gone on to win the title twenty-one times, their last coming in 2005 after defeating Newtownbutler.

Teemore clubman Peter Quinn served as president of the Gaelic Athletic Association from 1991 to 1994.

Barry Owens became the first Teemore player to win an All Star in 2004. He was later honoured for a second time in 2006.

Notable players
 Barry Owens
 Peter Quinn
 Seán Quinn

Honours
 Fermanagh Senior Football Championship (21): 1904, 1905, 1906, 1910, 1911, 1912, 1913, 1914, 1915, 1916, 1917, 1924, 1926, 1929, 1935, 1969, 1971, 1974, 1975, 1983, 2005
 Fermanagh Intermediate Football Championship (1): 2012
 Fermanagh Junior Football Championship (1): 1959

References

External links
 Teemore Shamrocks Official Website

Gaelic football clubs in County Fermanagh
Gaelic games clubs in County Fermanagh